"Timeless and True Love" is a song written by Buzz Cason, Charlie Black and Austin Roberts, recorded by American country music trio The McCarters. It was released in December 1987 as the first single from their album The Gift. The song peaked at number 5 on the Billboard Hot Country Singles chart.

Charts

Weekly charts

Year-end charts

References

1987 debut singles
The McCarters songs
Warner Records singles
Songs written by Buzz Cason
Song recordings produced by Paul Worley
Songs written by Charlie Black
Songs written by Austin Roberts (singer)